The DesRoches Nunataks are two nunataks standing 3 nautical miles (6 km) east of the Postel Nunatak in the southwestern Patuxent Range, Pensacola Mountains. They were mapped by the United States Geological Survey from surveys and U.S. Navy air photos, 1956–66, and were named by the Advisory Committee on Antarctic Names for Joseph DesRoches, a meteorologist at South Pole Station, winter 1967.

References 

Nunataks of Queen Elizabeth Land